Duvan (Dıwan) is a rural locality (a selo) and the administrative centre of Duvansky Selsoviet, Duvansky District, Bashkortostan, Russia. The population was 3,669 as of 2010. There are 44 streets.

Geography 
Duvan is located 30 km northwest of Mesyagutovo (the district's administrative centre) by road. Ulkundy is the nearest rural locality.

References 

Rural localities in Duvansky District
Ufa Governorate